Nandan may refer to:

Places 

 Nandan County, in Guangxi Province, China
Nandan, Hyōgo, a town in Mihara District, Hyōgo Prefecture, Japan
Nandan (Kolkata), a cultural center in Kolkata in the Indian state of West Bengal

People 

 Nandan of Ezhimalai, a Sangam Period ruler in South India
Meera Nandan (born 1989), an Indian actress
Satendra Nandan (born 1940), a Fiji Indian academic and politician
Satya Nandan, a diplomat and lawyer
Nandan Nilekani (born 1955), Indian entrepreneur
C. K. Nandan, an Indian umpire

Arts, entertainment, and media

Literature 

 Nandan, a Hindi-language children's magazine published by HT Media

Other uses 

 Nándàn (男旦), specialized male actors who play female roles (dàn) in Chinese opera

See also 

 Nandanar (disambiguation)